Mordechai Twersky (1770–1837), known as the Maggid of Chernobyl, was a Ukrainian rabbi.  He was the son of Rabbi Menachem Nachum Twersky of Chornobyl and the second rebbe of the Chernobyl Hasidic dynasty. (The family surname originally comes from Tiberias, as in Lake Tiberias). All of his sons served as rebbes, from whom several branches of Hasidism emerged today, including thousands of Chasidim, including Skver, Chernobyl and Rachmastrivka.

Biography

Twersky was born in Chernobyl to Sarah and Rabbi Menachem Nachum of Chernobyl, a disciple of the Baal Shem Tov and the Maggid of Mezeritch and author of the book Me'or Einayim.

Twersky married Chaya Sara the daughter of Rabbi Aharon of Karlin; after her death he married Faiga the daughter of Rabbi Dovid Leykes who was a student of the Baal Shem Tov. He had eight sons and one daughter. His sons became prominent rebbes and were a part of the effort in spreading Chasidus throughout Ukraine.

Rabbi Mordechai had many Hasidim and many towns appointed him as their "Magid Meisharim". Among his students are Rabbi  (now Novi Velidnyky) and Rabbi  (of Ovruch).

According to Hasidic thought, Twersky was in charge of sustaining all the Tzadikim Nistarim (hidden tzaddikim) in his generation. Throughout his life Twersky collected large amounts of charity, and before his death he regretted not collecting even more than he did.

His thoughts, sermons and discourses were published in his book Likutei Torah, which was praised by other famous Chassidic leaders. In 2001, the book was reprinted in a revised edition, with the addition of index, called "Likutei Torah Ha-Shalem".

Throughout his teachings, Twersky stressed the importance of pure speech and pure thought as a condition for a proper prayer connection. He also spoke of including all Jewish souls in one's prayer, even evil people. By doing so, evil people will stand a better chance of repenting (teshuvah).

His nephew (grandson of his brother-in-law Rabbi Avraham of Korostyshiv) Rabbi Yisrael of Rizhin named one of his sons Mordechai, while Rabbi Mordechai of Chornobyl was still alive, apparently in contradiction to Ashkenazi Jewish tradition which does not name children after living relatives. Asked about this, Rabbi Yisrael replied: "Our uncle from Chornobyl is already a few years above this world, as if he is not in this world." Twersky died a few years later in May 1837, exactly at the same date that Mordechai (Rabbi Mordechai Fayvush of Husyatyn) was born, on the 35th day of the Sefiras Haomer.

While still alive, Twersky prepared his place of rest on the outskirts of the village of Hnativka near Kyiv. He selected such a place: "because there is no house of idol worship, and the sound of impure bells won't disturb my rest in the grave". Indeed, his gravesite overlooks pastoral hills and the river.

Throughout his life Rabbi Mordechai collected large amounts of money for tzedakah (charity), but before his death he regretted not collecting even more than he did. His thoughts, sermons and discourses were published in his book Likutei Torah, which was praised for its holiness by other Hasidic leaders. Throughout his teachings, Rabbi Mordechai stressed the importance of pure speech and pure thought as a condition for a proper prayer connection. He also spoke of including all Jewish souls in one's prayer, even evil people. By doing so, evil people will stand a better chance of repenting (teshuvah).

All of Rebbe Mordechai's eight sons became rebbes in different cities.

References

People from Kiev Voivodeship
Rebbes of Chernobyl
1770 births
1837 deaths